Optical granulometry is the process of measuring the different grain sizes in a granular material, based on a photograph.  Technology has been created to analyze a photograph and create statistics based on what the picture portrays.  This information is vital in maintaining machinery in various trades worldwide.  Mining companies can use optical granulometry to analyze inactive or moving rock to quantify the size of these fragments.  Forestry companies can zero in on wood chip sizes without stopping the production process, and minimize sizing errors.

With more photoanalysis technologies being produced, mining companies have shown an increased interest in these types of systems because of their ability to maintain efficiency throughout the mining process. Companies are saving millions of dollars annually because of this new technology, and are cutting back on maintenance costs on equipment.

In order for optical granulometry to be completely successful, an accurate photo must be taken – under sufficient lighting, and using proper technology – to obtain quantified results. If these requirements are met, an image analysis system can be implemented.

The process

Software uses four basic steps in determining the average size of material:

See the Wikipedia article on Photoanalysis to see how mining, forestry and agricultural companies are using this technology to improve quality control techniques.

See also 
 Particle-size distribution
 Grain size
 Granulometry (morphology)

Notes

References

 Measurement of Blast Fragmentation: Proceedings of a Workshop Held Parallel With Fragblast-5, Montreal, 26–29 August 1996, by John A. Franklin, Takis Katsabanis, Published by Taylor & Francis, 1996,

External links
Free Web Application for Particle and Grain Analysis

Mining techniques
Image processing
Granulometric analyses